The Lazio regional election of 2000 took place on 16 April 2000.

Francesco Storace (National Alliance) was elected President, defeating incumbent Piero Badaloni (The Democrats).

Results

Elections in Lazio
2000 elections in Italy